Vyacheslav Mykhaylovych Khruslov (born 18 September 1962 in Kharkiv) is a Ukrainian football coach and a former player.

Career
He worked as an assistant coach for FC Dnipro Dnipropetrovsk.

Honours
Dynamo Kyiv
Ukrainian Premier League champion: 1992–93
Ukrainian Cup winner: 1992–93

References

1962 births
Footballers from Kharkiv
Living people
Soviet footballers
FC Olympik Kharkiv players
FC Polissya Zhytomyr players
FC Ahrotekhservis Sumy players
Ukrainian footballers
FC Dynamo Kyiv players
FC Metalurh Kupyansk players
Ukrainian Premier League players
FC Dynamo-2 Kyiv players
FC Tyumen players
Ukrainian expatriate footballers
Expatriate footballers in Russia
Russian Premier League players
FC Metalist Kharkiv players
FC Metalist-2 Kharkiv players
FC Arsenal Kharkiv players
Ukrainian football managers
Association football defenders
FC Metalist-2 Kharkiv managers
FC Metalist 1925 Kharkiv managers